Goldwax Records was an American record label founded in Memphis, Tennessee, United States, in 1964 by Quinton Claunch and Rudolph V. "Doc" Russell.

History
Claunch was a hardware store owner who had previously worked as a country music guitarist, a session musician at Sun Records, a songwriter, and a record producer, and had co-founded Hi Records in 1957 before selling his stake two years later. Russell was a pharmacist who was interested in becoming involved in the music business.

The label had its biggest successes with James Carr, who had a series of hits on the R&B chart between 1967 and 1969, including "You've Got My Mind Messed Up" and "The Dark End of the Street". It also had some success with The Ovations, Spencer Wiggins, and Wee Willie Walker.  The label was dissolved in 1969, as a result of  differences between Claunch and Russell as well as Carr's erratic behaviour.  In the mid 1980s, the company was re-launched by Memphis businessman Elliott Clark, and Claunch became its President, but he left again in the 1990s.

Notable artists
 James Carr 
 Spencer Wiggins
 The Ovations 
 Percy Milem
 The Lyrics
 O.V. Wright
 George Jackson
 Wee Willie Walker
 Timmy Thomas 
 Eddie Jefferson
 George and Greer
 Barbara Perry
 Gene Miller
 Drothy Williams
 Eddie Bond
 Ben Atkins
 Jeb Stuart

See also
 Stax Records 
 Hi Records 
 Fame Studios 
 TK Records 
 Malaco Records 
 Ichiban Records 
 Southern soul

References

External links
 Album discography
Singles discography

American independent record labels
Record labels established in 1964
Rhythm and blues record labels
Soul music record labels
Record labels based in Tennessee